Basicò is a comune (municipality) in the Metropolitan City of Messina in the Italian region Sicily, located about  east of Palermo and about  southwest of Messina.

Basicò borders the following municipalities: Montalbano Elicona, Tripi.

Public transport

Railways 
Novara-Montalbano-Furnari railway station is on the Palermo–Messina railway. It is served by trains run by Trenitalia, including services from Messina. Outside of the station is available a Uber service by App.

Bus and tram 
Basicò is served by bus provided from Azienda Siciliana Trasporti.

References

Cities and towns in Sicily